George C. Drew was a British experimental psychologist.

Life
In 1959, Drew was appointed Head of the Department of Psychology at University College London. As Head he ensured that the department was recognised as a biological science located within the Faculty of Science. The department began to offer a BSc Honours degree in Psychology.

Drew was active in the British Psychological Society of which he was elected president in 1962. His Presidential address was entitled The study of accidents in which he argued that psychologists tend to shelter [their] insecurity as psychologists in a methodological mystique rather than expertise. He also talked about the impact of alcohol on accidents (Drew, 1963).

Research
His research was in the area of skilled behaviour. His work on the effect of alcohol on various skills was some of the research leading to the introduction of the breathalyser (Drew et al., 1959).

Publications
 Drew, G.C. (1963). The study of accidents. Bulletin of the British Psychological Society, 16(52), 1–10.
 Drew, G.C. (1942). Mental fatigue. Flying Personnel Research Committee, Report No. 227. 
 Drew, G.C., Colquhoun, W.P., & Long, H.A. (1959). Effect of small doses of alcohol on a skill resembling driving. London: HMSO.

Awards
 1962 - President, British Psychological Society

References

British psychologists
Presidents of the British Psychological Society
Experimental psychologists
Academics of University College London